Pierre Dupuy may refer to:

Pierre Dupuy (scholar) (1582–1651), French scholar
Pierre Dupuy (diplomat) (1896–1969), Canadian diplomat